Agawam is a ghost town in Grady County, Oklahoma.

History
Agawam was founded around 1909, when its post office was built; the post office closed in 1918. 

On 19 October 1915, two Rock Island Railroad trains collided head-on here, a southbound passenger train and a northbound freight train, resulting in seven fatalities and numerous injuries; engineer William Powell was blamed for the accident. 

In October 1922, it was announced that Agawam, located on the main line of the Rock Island Railroad, would become a shipping point for a gas field in Grady County, due to its location: four miles from the Oklahoma Gas Company's pumping station. Agawam was described as a "new oil town" in 1923, when an auction of town lots was held. 

A gymnasium was completed in 1935. In 1955, Agawam had a grade school with a "small enrollment", but it was large enough to field a very good girls' basketball team that, over the course of three years, had amassed 90 wins against four losses, despite usually only having seven players.

Agawam's population was 35 in 1960.

References

External link
 Agawam on GhostTowns.com

Populated places established in 1909
1909 establishments in Oklahoma
Ghost towns in Oklahoma